SM U-142 was one of the 329 submarines serving in the Imperial German Navy in World War I. 
U-142 was not engaged in the naval warfare.

References

Notes

Citations

Bibliography

World War I submarines of Germany
1918 ships
U-boats commissioned in 1918
Ships built in Kiel
Type U 142 submarines